Ilfov may refer to:

Ilfov (river), a tributary of the river Dâmbovița, Romania
Ilfov County, the county that surrounds Bucharest, Romania